, , or  is an  long river which has runs through the municipalities of Tydal and Selbu in Trøndelag county, Norway and Åre Municipality in Jämtland county, Sweden.  The river Nea is a part of the Nea-Nidelvvassdraget watershed.  Some of the main villages along the river include: Østby, Ås, Aunet, and Gressli in Tydal and Flora, Hyttbakken, Selbu, and Mebonden in Selbu.

The river is first named Nean at the eastern end of the artificial lake Sylsjön, which lies in Åre Municipality and Berg Municipality in Sweden. On the downstream side of the lake, the river continues through the smaller lake Vessingsjøen before continuing on its westward course. At the municipal center of Ås the river Tya joins it.

See also
List of rivers in Norway

References

Rivers of Trøndelag
Rivers of Jämtland County
Tydal
Selbu
Rivers of Norway